St. Mary's Academy is a private Catholic convent school in Meerut, Uttar Pradesh, India. The school was established as a boys-only school on 2 February 1952 by Society of the Brothers of St. Patrick.

The school only admits students in Grade 1 through a competitive entrance examination followed by an interview. The students take the Indian Certificate of Secondary Education in tenth grade and Indian School Certificate (ISC) thereafter. The principal is Rev. Brother Edward Sebastian.

In the All-India Co-ed Schools rankings 2014, St. Mary's Academy was ranked first in Meerut and seventh in academic reputation all over India.

Campus

Since the early 1960s, the school has had its campus in the leafy suburbs of Meerut, next to the Mall Road and Gandhi Park. The 400-acre campus has sports facilities along with an auditorium.

Ties with other schools
From its foundation in 1952, the school has maintained ties with almost every school in the city by organising many events such as debates, cricket tournament, football tournament, and table tennis tournaments. It has been doing well by maintaining a perfect relationship with the St. Patrick's Academy, another Patrician Brothers' school in the city.

St. Mary's Academy is also a feeder school to St. George's College, Mussoorie, which is another school of the Patrician Brothers society.

Rankings
St. Mary's Academy, Meerut Cantt. (U.P.) was ranked No 5. in India, No.1 in Uttar Pradesh, and No. 1 in Meerut under category "Top 20 ICSE Schools of India 2021".

Course curriculum

The courses of study follow the pattern of the Indian Certificate of Secondary Education (ICSE) and the Indian School Certificate (ISC) examination, conducted by the Council for the Indian School Certificate Examinations, New Delhi. The subjects of study include English, Hindi, Mathematics, Physics, Chemistry, Biology, History, Geography, Sanskrit, Art, Craft, Economics, Commerce, Accounting, Computer Science, and Socially Useful Productive Work and Community Service.

Extracurricular activities and sports

Some cultural activities include debates, elocution contests and dramatics. Sports include physical training, outdoor games, athletics and gymnastics.

Ex-Marian Association
Old students of the school are part of EXMA (Ex-Marian Association). There are active networking groups on LinkedIn and Facebook.

Notable alumni
Marians have gone on to achieve prominence in business, politics, government service, the armed forces of India, commerce, journalism, the arts and literature. Marians have founded and led companies while raising millions of dollars in funding. Some of the popular companies founded by Marians are WildCraft, Four Fountains Spa, CliQr Technologies, and Instart Logic.

 Abhishek Bansal, CEO and Co-Founder, Shadowfax
 Gaurav Dublish, Co-Founder, Wildcraft Private Ltd.
 Ashu Garg, General Partner, Foundation Capital
 Gaurav Manglik, President and CEO, CliQr Technologies
 Manav Mital, Co-Founder, Instart
 Lieutenant General, Harcharanjit Singh Panag
 Pravesh Rana, Model, VJ

Gallery

See also
 CISCE
 List of educational institutions in Meerut

References

External links
 

Schools in Meerut
Patrician Brothers schools
Catholic schools in India
Primary schools in Uttar Pradesh
High schools and secondary schools in Uttar Pradesh
Christian schools in Uttar Pradesh
Educational institutions established in 1952
1952 establishments in Uttar Pradesh